Odrga is a small settlement in the Municipality of Trebnje in eastern Slovenia. It lies on the right bank of the Temenica River opposite Trebnje. The area is part of the historical region of Lower Carniola. The municipality is now included in the Southeast Slovenia Statistical Region.

References

External links
Odrga at Geopedia

Populated places in the Municipality of Trebnje